Bala Shekar Kesh (also Romanized as Bālā Shekar Kesh; also known as Shekar Kesh and Shekar Kesh-e Bālā) is a village in Otaqvar Rural District, Otaqvar District, Langarud County, Gilan Province, Iran. At the 2006 census, its population was 262, in 83 families.

References 

Populated places in Langarud County